Postal codes in Luxembourg are entirely numeric and consist of four digits. The first digit indicates the region, however this subdivision of the territory does not correspond exactly to the usual administrative subdivision (districts and cantons).
 Postal codes starting with a 1 or a 2 are located in the capital city of Luxembourg.
 Postal codes starting with a 3 are located South of the capital city.
 Postal codes starting with a 4 are located in the city of Esch-sur-Alzette.
 Postal codes starting with a 5 are located in the South-East of the country.
 Postal codes starting with a 6 are located in the North-East of the country.
 Postal codes starting with a 7 are located North of the capital city.
 Postal codes starting with an 8 are located in the West of the country.
 Postal codes starting with a 9 are located in the North of the country.

In larger municipalities every street has its own postal code, smaller municipalities often have only one code for the whole town. If there are several postal codes within one municipality, they are ordered alphabetically, except that the first numbers are reserved for important clients (administrations and companies).

External links
Search for a postcode in Luxembourg
Luxemburg Postal Codes in XML, JSON and CSV format

Luxembourg
Postal system of Luxembourg